Sukhmani Sadana is an Indian writer and actress from Amritsar. She is also The Editor-in-Chief of an International Digital Magazine called F.A.C.E. Sukhmani studied in Welham Girls School, Dehradun and graduated from Lady Shri Ram College, Delhi University. She also studied at St. Xavier's College, Mumbai, Mumbai. She played the role of Uttara Bakshi in the TV series Khotey Sikkey that aired on Sony Entertainment Television.

Career
She worked as a copywriter in Ogilvy, Mumbai writing ads for brands such as Vodafone.

She has written the script for 1920 London, a horror film.

She has also written films for Kunal Kohli, Aniruddha Roy Chowdhury, Endemol, Balaji, Netflix. She won an award for ‘Best Actress’ in Digital Awards 2017 for her web series Love Bytes on Sony Liv.

She appeared in Sacred Games as Bunty's sister Mikki. She also did a guest appearance in Anurag Kashyap Manmarziyaan.

Sukhmani has hosted more than 100 travel shows with channels such as NDTV Good Times, National Geographic, Discovery Channel, CNN IBN and Travel XP. She hosted live events with celebrities including Amitabh Bachchan, Virat Kohli, Aditya Roy Kapoor, Suniel Shetty, and Ayushman Khurana. She also hosted the 2019 IIFA Awards.

She acted in TV shows, such as Heart Break Hotel and Parchayee, short stories by Ruskin Bond on ZEE5. She acted and wrote the web series Udan Patolas for Applause Entertainment Aditya Birla Group.

Her releases in Acting in 2022 are the web series Dil Bekaraar, which is based on the novel ‘Those Pricey Thakur Girls’, for Disney + Hotstar, where she replaced Gauhar Khan. And another web series Apaharan for Zee5 and Alt where she played a negative role. She also acted in Broken News where she played the role of Jaideep Ahlawat's wife. And her fourth release this year as an actress is Udan Patolas on Amazon Mini Tv. 

In writing her release in 2022 has been the film Rocketry with R. Madhavan and Shah Rukh Khan where she was in the writer's team, Udan Patolas on Amazon Mini tv that she wrote and her next film is Jogi, a film on Netflix featuring Diljit Dosanjh, directed by Ali Abbas Zafar.

Filmography

Films

Television

Web series

As writer

References

External links 
 
 

1990 births
Living people
Indian television actresses
Indian women screenwriters
Welham Girls' School alumni